Coeymans Hollow is a hamlet in Albany County, New York, United States. Coeymans Hollow has a post office with ZIP code 12046.

References

Hamlets in Albany County, New York
Hamlets in New York (state)